Funston is a town in Colquitt County, Georgia, United States. The population was 449 at the 2010 census.

History
The Georgia General Assembly incorporated Funston in 1970.

Geography

Funston is located at  (31.198593, -83.873051).

Demographics

As of the census of 2000, there were 426 people, 155 households, and 121 families residing in the town. The racial makeup of the town was 71.60% White, 22.54% African American, 0.47% Native American, 0.23% Asian, 4.93% from other races, and 0.23% from two or more races. Hispanic or Latino of any race were 11.27% of the population.

There were 155 households, out of which 38.1% had children under the age of 18 living with them, 60.0% were married couples living together, 14.8% had a female householder with no husband present, and 21.9% were non-families. 17.4% of all households were made up of individuals, and 8.4% had someone living alone who was 65 years of age or older.  The average household size was 2.75 and the average family size was 3.15.

In the town, the population was spread out, with 29.8% under the age of 18, 5.9% from 18 to 24, 31.7% from 25 to 44, 19.5% from 45 to 64, and 13.1% who were 65 years of age or older.  The median age was 33 years. For every 100 females, there were 100.0 males.  For every 100 females age 18 and over, there were 90.4 males.

The median income for a household in the town was $25,625, and the median income for a family was $27,188. Males had a median income of $22,266 versus $17,656 for females. The per capita income for the town was $12,473.  About 22.0% of families and 22.3% of the population were below the poverty line, including 38.4% of those under age 18 and 7.4% of those age 65 or over.

Climate
The climate in this area is characterized by relatively high temperatures and evenly distributed precipitation throughout the year.  According to the Köppen Climate Classification system, Funston has a humid subtropical climate, abbreviated "Cfa" on climate maps.

References

Towns in Colquitt County, Georgia
Towns in Georgia (U.S. state)